Marh Assembly constituency is one of the 87 constituencies in the Jammu and Kashmir Legislative Assembly of Jammu and Kashmir a north state of India. Marh is also part of Jammu Lok Sabha constituency.

Member of Legislative Assembly

 1962: Guranditta Mal, Indian National Congress
 1967: Guranditta Mal, Indian National Congress
 1972: Sushil Kumar Dhara, Indian National Congress
 1977: Tulsi Ram, Janata Party
 1983: Mula Ram, Indian National Congress
 1987: Mula Ram, Indian National Congress
 1996: Ajay Sadhotra, National Conference
 2002: Ajay Sadhotra, National Conference
 2008: Sukh Nandan Kumar, Bharatiya Janata Party

Election results

2014

See also
 Jammu
 List of constituencies of Jammu and Kashmir Legislative Assembly

References

Assembly constituencies of Jammu and Kashmir
Jammu district